The 2016 Imola Superbike World Championship round was the fifth round of the 2016 Superbike World Championship. It took place over the weekend of 29–30 April and 1 May 2016 at the Autodromo Enzo e Dino Ferrari.

Championship standings after the round

Superbike Championship standings after Race 1

Superbike Championship standings after Race 2

Supersport Championship standings

External links
 Superbike Race 1 results
 Superbike Race 2 results
 Supersport Race results

2016 Superbike World Championship season
Imola Superbike World Championship round
Imola Superbike World Championship round
Imola Superbike World Championship round